In Taíno culture, the hupia (also opia, opi'a, op'a, operi'to) is the spirit of a person who has died.

In Taíno spiritual beliefs, hupias (ghost spirits of those who had died) were contrasted with goeiza, spirits of the living. While a living goieza had definite form, after passing away the spirit was released as a hupia and went to live in a remote earthly paradise called Coaybay. Hupias were believed to be able to assume many forms, sometimes appearing as faceless people or taking the form of a deceased loved one. Hupias in human form could always be distinguished by their lack of a navel. Hupias were also associated with bats and said to hide or sleep during the day and come out at night to eat guava fruit.

Hupias, as ghost spirits of those who died and the night, were feared and said to seduce women and kidnap people who ventured outside after dark.

Concept of the Hupias or Ghost Spirits
On the matter of what the Tainos believed as to the Hupia (Ghost Spirit). The Taino people never believed in the concept and or idea of Death, as they believed in passing on of the human spirit and an Hereafter life. The Spanish historians and writers of the time however gave their own bias religious interpretation based upon their own Catholic and Christian ideas and or concepts of Death and as to the soul of the humans going to some place they call Heaven and the soul awaiting a day of judgement by their God.

Literary references
In the novel Jurassic Park by Michael Crichton, hupia are suspected of an attack on an 18-year-old boy working on construction for Jurassic Park on Isla Nublar. The culprit is later described as a Velociraptor. Hupia are also accused of a rash of attacks on infants and other people in rural Costa Rica. They were described as "faceless night ghosts who kidnapped small children". Later events showed that the real culprits were Procompsognathus that had escaped from Isla Nublar.

See also
 Mask Master: Taino Dictionary
 Crichton, Michael. 1991. Jurassic Park, Random House, 1990: 8-10, 23-24. .
 Dasrath, Sparky. The Arawaks
 Deiros, Pablo. Fundación Kairós.  Religiones indígenas del área caribeña
 Guitar, Lynne. 2005. Taino Caves
 Poviones-Bishop, Maria. The Kislak Foundation. The Bat and the Guava: Life and Death in the Taino Worldview

References

Supernatural legends
Taíno mythology
Ghosts
Undead
Caribbean legendary creatures